Goff Glacier is a broad glacier flowing from Parker Peak into the head of Koether Inlet on the north side of Thurston Island, Antarctica. It was named by the Advisory Committee on Antarctic Names after Lieutenant Robert G. Goff, co-pilot of PBM Mariner aircraft in the Eastern Group of U.S. Navy Operation Highjump, which obtained aerial photographs of Thurston Island and adjacent coastal areas, 1946–47.

See also
 List of glaciers in the Antarctic
 Glaciology

Maps
 Thurston Island – Jones Mountains. 1:500000 Antarctica Sketch Map. US Geological Survey, 1967.
 Antarctic Digital Database (ADD). Scale 1:250000 topographic map of Antarctica. Scientific Committee on Antarctic Research (SCAR). Since 1993, regularly upgraded and updated.

References

 

Glaciers of Thurston Island